Rohrdorf is a former municipality in the district of Baden in the canton of Aargau, Switzerland.

It ceased to exist in 1873, when it was split into the three new municipalities Niederrohrdorf, Oberrohrdorf and Remetschwil.

Former municipalities of Aargau